{|

{{Infobox ship career
|Hide header=
|Ship name=*RMS Strathnaver;
SS Strathnaver
|Ship namesake= Strathnaver in Sutherland, Scotland
|Ship country= United Kingdom
|Ship flag= 
|Ship owner=  P&O Steam Navigation Co
|Ship operator=  P&O Steam Navigation Co
|Ship route= Tilbury — Brisbane
|Ship ordered=January 1930 
|Ship builder= Vickers-Armstrong, Barrow
|Ship original cost=
|Ship yard number= 663
|Ship way number=
|Ship laid down=
|Ship launched= 5 February 1931
|Ship completed= September 1931
|Ship christened=5 February 1931 by Lady Janet Bailey
|Ship acquired=
|Ship maiden voyage= 2 October 1931
|Ship in service=
|Ship out of service=
|Ship registry=  London
|Ship identification=*UK official number 162619
Call sign GRPZ

|Ship homeport= Tilbury
|Ship fate= Scrapped in Hong Kong, 1962
|Ship notes= 
}}

|}

RMS Strathnaver, later SS Strathnaver, was an ocean liner of the Peninsular and Oriental Steam Navigation Company (P&O).

She was the first of five sister ships in what came to be called the "Strath" class. All previous P&O steamships had black-painted hulls and funnels but Strathnaver and her sisters were painted with white hulls and buff funnels, which earned them the nickname "The Beautiful White Sisters" or just "The White Sisters".

Building 

The Vickers-Armstrong shipyard at Barrow-in-Furness built all five "Strath"-class liners. Strathnaver was launched on 5 February 1931, completed in September 1931 and left Tilbury on her maiden voyage on 2 October.

In 1929 P&O had introduced its first large turbo-electric liner, . The company chose the same propulsion system for Strathnaver and Strathaird, but the "Straths" were slightly larger ships, their turbo-electric equipment was much more powerful and they were about  faster than Viceroy of India.Strathnaver and Strathaird were very similar. Each had four water-tube boilers and two auxiliary boilers. These supplied current to two electric motors with a combined rating of 6,315 NHP or 28,000 shp. British Thomson-Houston of Rugby, Warwickshire built the turbo-generators and motors. The motors drove a pair of inward-rotating screw propellers. Strathnaver and Strathaird had three funnels but only the middle one served as a smoke stack: the first and third funnels were dummies.Strathnaver and Strathaird were each equipped with direction finding equipment, an echo sounding device and a gyrocompass As built, Strathnaver had accommodation for 498 first class and 668 tourist class passengers and 476 crew. In first class the ship had 262 single-berth rooms with the rest double-berthed, a special suite on "D" deck had 12 de luxe cabins each with a private bathroom. The tourist-class cabins were either two or four-berthed.

The ship was launched at Barrow on 5 February 1931 by Lady Janet Bailey, daughter of Lord Inchcape, the Chairman of P&O.

ServiceStrathnaver and Strathaird mostly worked the Tilbury — Brisbane route via the Suez Canal. They also undertook occasional cruises.

In October 1938 the ship was chartered to move 1,200 British troops from India to Palestine.

In 1939 or 1940 the two sisters were requisitioned as troop ships. Strathnavers war service included bringing Australian and New Zealand troops to Suez and Allied troops to the Anzio landings. She remained a troop ship until November 1948, when she was returned to P&O. In her nine years of government service she carried 129,000 troops and travelled 352,000 miles.

P&O had Harland and Wolff in Belfast refit her for civilian service. First class was abolished and all accommodation was made tourist class, which slightly increased total passenger capacity from 1,168 to 1,252. The dummy first and third funnels were removed, which made Strathnaver look more like her later sisters Stratheden, Strathallan and Strathmore. Strathaird had already had her dummy funnels removed in 1947. When she returned to service in 1950 she had accommodation for 567 passengers in first-class and 458 in tourist-class.

Originally planned to be retired in mid-1962 the Strathnaver was retired a few months earlier due to an Australian government decision not to reserve any more berths for migrants in the first five-months of 1962. P&O sold Strathnaver and Strathaird for scrap to Shun Fung Ironworks of Hong Kong. Strathnaver arrived in Hong Kong in April 1962 on her last voyage.  replaced both Strathnaver and Strathaird'' on the Australia route.

Notes

References

 
 

1931 ships
Ships built in Barrow-in-Furness
Cruise ships
Ocean liners of the United Kingdom
Ships of P&O (company)
Steamships of the United Kingdom
Troop ships of the United Kingdom
Turbo-electric steamships